Tigab (also Romanized as Tīgāb; also known as Tīgh Āb) is a village in Qaen Rural District, in the Central District of Qaen County, South Khorasan Province, Iran. At the 2006 census, its population was 630, in 146 families.

References 

Populated places in Qaen County